The 2006 African Fencing Championships were held in Casablanca, Morocco from 20 to 23 June.

Medal summary

Men's events

Women's events

Medal table

References
 2006 Annual Report of the International Fencing Federation

2006
African Fencing Championships
International fencing competitions hosted by Morocco
2006 in Moroccan sport